Runcton Holme is a village and civil parish in the English county of Norfolk.
For the purposes of local government, it falls within the district of King's Lynn and West Norfolk. The civil parish includes South Runcton.

The villages name means 'Pole farm/settlement on an island', perhaps denoting a trackway or an enclosed settlement.

The parish church of St James, Runcton Holme, is a Grade I listed building. St Andrew's in South Runcton is Grade II*.

See also
North Runcton

Notes 

http://kepn.nottingham.ac.uk/map/place/Norfolk/Runcton%20Holme

External links

Villages in Norfolk
Civil parishes in Norfolk
King's Lynn and West Norfolk